Samuel Muanda Mpaka Pungi (born 12 March 2001), is an Angolan footballer who plays for Paju Citizen FC as a centre back.

Youth career
Samuel started playing football in 2007 at Pyeongtaek United. He began his career as a professional football player at Chungdam Middle school in the same city.

Since his high school year, he went to Jinju high school football team, which is a youth team of Gyeongnam FC. However, he later returned to Pyeongtaek and joined Chungdam high school football team.

Club career
Samuel joined Pohang Steelers of K League 1 on 4 December 2020. However, he was not able to play for the official matches as his naturalisation process kept being delayed.

For the 2022 season, he left Pohang Steelers and joined Paju Citizen FC of K3 League.

Personal life
Samuel immigrated from Angola to South Korea with his family in 2007 as a refugee. He took naturalisation test in 2021, but the result announcement has been delayed due to COVID-19 pandemic.

References

External links
 

2001 births
Living people
Footballers from Luanda
Angolan footballers
Association football defenders
K League 1 players
K3 League players
Pohang Steelers players
Angolan expatriate footballers
Expatriate footballers in South Korea